M.K. Atatürk Spor Salonu is a light-rail station on the Karşıyaka Tram line of the Tram İzmir network in Turkey. The station consists of an island platform serving two tracks. M.K. Atatürk Spor Salonu is located on Caher Dudayev Boulevard adjacent to the Karşıyaka Arena and Mavibahçe Shopping Center in Mavişehir, Karşıyaka. The station was opened on 11 April 2017, along with the entire tram line.

Connections
ESHOT operates city bus service on Caher Dudayev Boulevard.

References

External links
Tram İzmir - official website

Railway stations opened in 2017
2017 establishments in Turkey
Karşıyaka District
Tram transport in İzmir
Things named after Mustafa Kemal Atatürk